Middle Huaihai Road is a station on Line 13 of the Shanghai Metro. This station is located on Ruijin 1st Road (near Middle Huaihai Road).  The station opened on December 19, 2015 as part of the extension to Line 13.

Lines 1 and 14 pass through without stopping.

Railway stations in Shanghai
Line 13, Shanghai Metro
Shanghai Metro stations in Huangpu District
Railway stations in China opened in 2015